

376001–376100 

|-id=029
| 376029 Blahová ||  || Blahová, a small Slovak village || 
|-id=084
| 376084 Annettepeter ||  || Annette Peter (born 1971), wife of German discoverer Erwin Schwab || 
|}

376101–376200 

|-bgcolor=#f2f2f2
| colspan=4 align=center | 
|}

376201–376300 

|-bgcolor=#f2f2f2
| colspan=4 align=center | 
|}

376301–376400 

|-bgcolor=#f2f2f2
| colspan=4 align=center | 
|}

376401–376500 

|-bgcolor=#f2f2f2
| colspan=4 align=center | 
|}

376501–376600 

|-id=574
| 376574 Michalkusiak ||  || Michal Kusiak (born 1986), an extraordinary popularizer of astronomy in Poland. The asteroid's name was suggested by astronomer Rafał Reszelewski. || 
|}

376601–376700 

|-id=694
| 376694 Kassák ||  || Lajos Kassák (1887–1967), a Hungarian poet, novelist, painter, essayist, editor and occasional translator. || 
|}

376701–376800 

|-bgcolor=#f2f2f2
| colspan=4 align=center | 
|}

376801–376900 

|-bgcolor=#f2f2f2
| colspan=4 align=center | 
|}

376901–377000 

|-bgcolor=#f2f2f2
| colspan=4 align=center | 
|}

References 

376001-377000